

Events
1 January – Digital Television arrives in the major state capitals of Australia and states in it, with the ABC and SBS permitted to operate multi-channel services.
24 January – The Seven Network loses the TV rights to the AFL for the first time, since televised football began in 1957. The rights are won by a Nine Network-Network Ten-Fox Footy Channel consortium.
5 February – The Weakest Link premieres on the Seven Network, airing twice a week, Mondays and Fridays, however, shortly before the commencement of the AFL season, the latter edition is moved forwards to Thursdays in Melbourne, Adelaide and Perth, and then in Sydney and Brisbane after the conclusion of the AFL season.
11 February – The Network Ten undergoes a major revamp in its production and circle logo and on air graphics as a part of a new network re-launch, with the launch of its motto Seriously Ten, which are both currently in use to the 2012 revamp.
22 February – The voice actors behind the Funimation dubbed version of Dragon Ball Z Sean Schemmel (Goku, Nails and King Kai) and Christopher Sabat (Piccolo, Vegeta and Yamcha) appear on Cheez TV for an interview on Network Ten.
26 March – The $10,000 bank target is achieved for the first time on an episode of The Weakest Link.
10 April – American mystery fiction television series CSI: Crime Scene Investigation premieres on the Nine Network and is shown every Tuesday at 8:30 pm.
22 April – The Australian version of Big Brother premieres on Network Ten.
25 April – Brooke Marshall wins the second season of The Mole, taking home $100,000 in prize money. Michael Laffy is revealed as the Mole, and Hal Pritchard is the runner-up.
7 May – Nine players who were voted off The Weakest Link early in previous episodes were given a second chance to win up to $100,000.
27 May – Nine previous winners of The Weakest Link appear on the show again for another chance to win up to $100,000. In this episode, the $10,000 bank target is achieved again.
2 June – The ABBA Tribute Show goes to air live on the Nine Network.
 22 June – Hi-5 celebrates its 100th episode.
24 June – Australian children's Sunday morning wrapper programme Couch Potato airs its final episode on ABC hosted by Abby Coleman and David Heinrich and finishing up with a rerun of SimsalaGrimm.
16 July – 
Network Ten's Melbourne-based drama series The Secret Life of Us makes its first screening debut.
The first season of Big Brother was won by Ben Williams.
Australian soap opera Home and Away has switched over to air on Channel 5 in the UK after ITV lost the rights to the series.
31 July – Australian miniseries Blue Murder finally screens in NSW and the ACT for the very first time on the ABC six years after its broadcast in other states and territories due to the life sentence of Neddy Smith.
1 August – The ABC launches its very first digital multi-channel service ABC Kids. The channel airs programmes aimed at children and runs from 6:00am to 6:00pm.
7 August – The final episode of Water Rats  goes to air on the Nine Network and the show was axed after six years.
8 August –
Australian rural drama series McLeod's Daughters, based on the 1996 telemovie of the same name, premieres on Nine Network, which broadcasts every Wednesday at 7:30 pm.
Long running Australian soap opera Neighbours begins airing on television stations in Ireland for the very first time on RTÉ.
11 September – Television networks relay coverage from CNN, NBC, ABC America and the BBC for up to 48 hours in the wake of 11 September attacks. Ten News made the record books as the first Australian Television News Service to ever cover the Coverage on its Late News bulletin with Sandra Sully.
29 September – The Seven Network televises its final game of AFL until March 2007.
November – After Prime Television axes Regional television news bulletins in Newcastle, Wollongong and Canberra, and Southern Cross Broadcasting axes regional bulletins in Canberra and North Queensland, the ABA holds an inquiry into the adequacy of regional news services. Bulletins eventually return to those areas in 2004, albeit in the form of two-minute updates during weekdays in the ratings season.
1 November – The ABC launches another digital multi-channel service called Fly TV. Airing from 6:00pm to 6:00am, the channel broadcasts music videos, reviews, comedy, drama, news programming, sport programmes, cartoons and current affairs for teenagers and young adults.
25 November – The 1999 Film Notting Hill starring Hugh Grant and Julia Roberts premieres on the Seven Network.
29 November – After 21 years, Sale of the Century is "rested". It later returns to the Nine Network as Temptation in 2005 and runs until 2007, and again 2008 until 2009. Also another Nine Network game show Burgo's Catch Phrase has given the axe after 4 years.
12 December – The American comedy-drama series Gilmore Girls premieres on the Nine Network.
December – The Nine Network will introduce a watermark on its programs. Until now, the Channel Nine watermark will now be broadcast on all news (until 2008 for the major revamp of its news bulletins, but reinstated in late 2009), current affairs and Live programs.
December – A record $72,900 is won on The Weakest Link'''s special titled The Best of the Best.

Debuts
Free-to-air
Domestic

International

Changes to network affiliation
This is a list of programmes which made their premiere on an Australian television network that had previously premiered on another Australian television network. The networks involved in the switch of allegiances are predominantly both free-to-air networks or both subscription television networks. Programs that have their free-to-air/subscription television premiere, after previously premiering on the opposite platform (free-to air to subscription/subscription to free-to air) are not included. In some cases, programs may still air on the original television network. This occurs predominantly with programs shared between subscription television networks.

Domestic

International

Subscription television
Domestic

International

Subscription premieres
This is a list of programs which made their premiere on Australian subscription television that had previously premiered on Australian free-to-air television. Programs may still air on the original free-to-air television network.

Domestic

International

Specials

Television shows

ABC
 Four Corners (1961–present)
 The Fat (2000–2003)

Seven Network
 Wheel of Fortune (1981–1996, 1996–2003, 2004–present)
 Home and Away (1988–present)
 Blue Heelers (1994–2006)
 Today Tonight (1995–present)
 All Saints (1998–present)
 Ground Force (1999–2004)
 AMV (2000–present)

Nine Network
 Today (1982–present)
 Sale of the Century (1980–2001)
 A Current Affair (1971–1978, 1988–2005, 2006–present)
 Australia's Funniest Home Video Show (1990–2000, 2000–2004, 2005–present)
 The AFL Footy Show (1994–present)
 The NRL Footy Show (1994–present)
 Water Rats (1996–2001)
 Burgo's Catch Phrase (1997–2001, 2002–2004)
 Who Wants to Be a Millionaire? (1999–2006, 2007–2010)
 Surprise Surprise (2000–2001)
 Backyard Blitz (2000–2007)

Network Ten
 Neighbours (1985–1989, 1989–present)
 GMA With Bert Newton (1991–2005)
 Rove Live'' (2000–2006)

Ending / Resting this year

See also 
 2001 in Australia
 List of Australian films of 2001

References